Reichsjugendführer ("National Youth Leader") was the highest paramilitary rank of the Hitler Youth. On 30 October 1931, Hitler appointed Baldur von Schirach as the Reich Youth Leader of the Nazi Party. In 1933, after the Nazi seizure of state power, all youth organizations in Germany were brought under Schirach's control and he was designated the Jugendführer des Deutschen Reiches on 17 June. When Schirach was named Gauleiter of the Reichsgau Vienna on 8 August 1940, Artur Axmann succeeded him as Reichsjugendführer. Axmann had served as Schirach's deputy since 1 May 1940.

List

Post-war
With the surrender of Nazi Germany, the Hitler Youth was disbanded by Allied authorities as part of the denazification process. Both Schirach and Axmann were condemned as war criminals by the leading Allies powers after the end of the Second World War in Europe, in particular for the role the two played in corrupting the minds of children. Schirach was sentenced to 20 years in prison. Axmann received only a 39-month prison sentence in May 1949. Later, in 1958, a West Berlin court fined Axman 35,000 marks (approximately £3,000, or US$8,300), about half the value of his property in Berlin. The court found him guilty of indoctrinating German youth with National Socialism until the end of the war.

References

Notes

Bibliography

Nazi paramilitary ranks
Hitler Youth